The 2016–17 Rice Owls women's basketball team represents Rice University during the 2016–17 NCAA Division I women's basketball season. The Owls, led by second year head coach Tina Langley, play their home games at the Tudor Fieldhouse and were members of Conference USA. They finished the season 22–13, 8–10 in C-USA play to finish in a 3 way tie for eighth place. They advanced to the quarterfinals of the C-USA women's tournament where they lost to Middle Tennessee. They were invited to the WBI where they defeat Lamar, Texas–Rio Grande Valley, Idaho and UNC Greensboro to become champions of the Women's Basketball Invitational.

Roster

Rankings

Schedule

|-
!colspan=9 style="background:#002469; color:#5e6062;"| Exhibition

|-
!colspan=9 style="background:#002469; color:#5e6062;"| Non-conference regular season

|-
!colspan=9 style="background:#002469; color:#5e6062;"| Conference USA regular season

|-
!colspan=9 style="background:#002469; color:#5e6062;"|Conference USA Women's Tournament

|-
!colspan=9 style="background:#002469; color:#5e6062;"|WBI

See also
2016–17 Rice Owls men's basketball team

References

Rice Owls women's basketball seasons
Rice
Rice
Women's Basketball Invitational championship seasons